Aluminium phosphate is a chemical compound. In nature it occurs as the mineral berlinite. Many synthetic forms of aluminium phosphate are known. They have framework structures similar to zeolites and some are used as catalysts, ion-exchangers or molecular sieves. Commercial aluminium phosphate gel is available.

Berlinite
AlPO4 is isoelectronic with Si2O4, silicon dioxide. Berlinite looks like quartz and has a structure that is similar to quartz with silicon replaced by Al and P. The AlO4 and PO4 tetrahedra alternate. Like quartz, AlPO4 exhibits chirality and piezoelectric properties. When heated, crystalline AlPO4 (berlinite) converts to tridymite and cristobalite forms, and this mirrors the behaviour of silicon dioxide.

Uses

Molecular sieves
There are many types of aluminium phosphate molecular sieves, generically known as "ALPOs". The first ones were reported in 1982. They all share the same chemical composition of AlPO4 and have framework structures with microporous cavities. The frameworks are made up of alternating AlO4 and PO4 tetrahedra. The denser cavity-less crystalline berlinite, shares the same alternating AlO4 and PO4 tetrahedra. The aluminophosphate framework structures vary one from another in the orientation of the AlO4 tetrahedra and PO4 tetrahedra to form different-sized cavities, and in this respect they are similar to the aluminosilicate zeolites, which differ in having electrically charged frameworks. A typical preparation of an aluminophosphate involves the hydrothermal reaction of phosphoric acid and aluminium in the form of hydroxide, an aluminium salt such as aluminium nitrate salt or alkoxide under controlled pH in the presence of organic amines. These organic molecules act as templates (now termed structure directing agents, SDAs) to direct the growth of the porous framework.

Other
Along with aluminium hydroxide, aluminium phosphate is one of the most common immunologic adjuvants (efficiency enhancers) in vaccinations. Aluminium adjuvant use is widespread due to their cheap price, long history of use, safety and efficiency with most antigens. It's unknown how such salts function as adjuvants.

Similar to aluminum hydroxide, AlPO4 is used as an antacid. It neutralizes stomach acid (HCl) by forming AlCl3 with it. Up to 20% of aluminum from ingested antacid salts can be absorbed from the gastrointestinal tract – despite some unverified concerns about the neurological effects of aluminum, aluminum phosphate and hydroxide salts are thought to be safe as antacids in normal use, even during pregnancy and breastfeeding.

Additional uses for AlPO4 in combination with or without other compounds are white colorants for pigments, corrosion inhibitors, cements and dental cements. Related compounds have also similar uses. For example, Al(H2PO4)3 is used in dental cements, metal coatings, glaze compositions and refractory binders; and Al(H2PO4)(HPO4) is used cement and refractory binders and adhesives.

Related compounds
AlPO4·2H2O dihydrate is found as the minerals variscite and meta-variscite. Aluminium phosphate dihydrate (variscite and meta-variscite) has a structure that can be regarded as an assembly of tetra- and octahedral units of phosphate anions, aluminium cations and water. Al3+ ions are 6-coordinate and PO43- ions are 4-coordinate.

A synthetic hydrated form, AlPO4·1.5H2O is also known.

See also
Phosphate minerals

References

Citations

External links
MSDS PDF

Phosphates
Aluminium compounds
Dehydrating agents
Antacids